The Central District of Sarvestan County is a district (bakhsh) in Sarvestan County, Fars Province, Iran. At the 2006 census, its population was 23,728, in 5,680 families.  The District has one city: Sarvestan.  The District has two rural districts (dehestan): Sarvestan Rural District and Shurjeh Rural District.

References 

Sarvestan County
Districts of Fars Province